The slender thread snake or slender worm snake (Namibiana gracilior) is a species of snake in the family Leptotyphlopidae. It is found in southern Namibia and western South Africa.

References

External Links
 iNaturalist page

Namibiana
Snakes of Africa
Reptiles of Namibia
Reptiles of South Africa
Reptiles described in 1910
Taxa named by George Albert Boulenger